Werner Kaiser may refer to:

  (1926-2013)
 Werner Kaiser (footballer) (born 1949)